Ishita Moitra (born 1983) is a screenwriter based in Mumbai, India.

Life
Moitra was born on 8 August 1983 in Bareilly in Uttar Pradesh.

Anearly work was the 2009 film Kambakht Ishq which she wrote with the director Sabir Khan.

She has written several films, Hindi TV shows and web series. Her work includes contributions to the script for the 2020 film Shakuntala Devi.

Work
Kambakkht Ishq Screenplay
Always Kabhi Kabhi Screenplay & Dialogues
Mere Dad Ki Maruti Dialogues
Dekha Ek Khwaab Dialogues 
Bade Achhe Lagte Hain Dialogues
Khotey Sikkey Dialogues
Ajeeb Daastaan Hai Ye Dialogues
Ragini MMS 2 Dialogues
Noor Dialogues
Half Girlfriend Dialogues
The Test Case Dialogues
Bepannaah
Four More Shots Please! Dialogues
Shakuntala Devi Dialogues

References

Indian women screenwriters
Living people
Screenwriters from Mumbai
Women writers from Maharashtra
Hindi screenwriters
1983 births